Hongkong Post is a government department of Hong Kong responsible for postal services, though operated as a trading fund. Founded in 1841, it was known as Postal Department or Post Office before the handover of Hong Kong in 1997. It has been a sub-member of the Universal Postal Union since 1877, and is a separate entity from China Post.

History

Merchants traded in Hong Kong on the two sides of Victoria Harbour as early as before the British possession in 1842. They complained about the absence of proper postal services and therefore the Postal Department was established.

The department was founded on 28 August 1841, but the first post office (known as 書信館 at that time), situated near the current site of St. John's Cathedral, opened on 12 November 1841. At first, its right to operation belonged to the Royal Mail, until its transfer to the Postmaster General on 1 May 1860.

On 8 December 1862, the office issued the first set of Hong Kong postal stamps. Before this time, only British troops in Hong Kong could use British stamps, while other local residents did not have access to British stamps. Until the handover of Hong Kong to China in 1997, mail for British forces serving in the then-colony used the British Forces Post Office number, BFPO 1.

The office introduced automated mail sorting in 1989, and machines were installed in the General Post Office.

There is no post code system in Hong Kong, although one has been under consideration since 2000.

Since August 1995, the office has operated as a trading fund and the full title of the head of the Office became "Postmaster General and general manager of the Post Office Trading Fund".

Postal history

During the colonial era, Hong Kong produced postage stamps simply bearing the name Hong Kong, printed alongside the likenesses (in profile) of the reigning monarchs of the United Kingdom, or royal symbols (for example, "EIIR").

Since Hong Kong's transfer of sovereignty to China in 1997, stamps issued have borne the name "Hong Kong, China". British Hong Kong postage stamps are no longer valid for prepayment of postage and cannot be repurchased by the Post Office.

Post offices

Hongkong Post operates 128 post offices throughout Hong Kong. As of 2007, 34 post offices existed on Hong Kong Island, 42 in Kowloon, 45 in the New Territories and 8 on the Outlying Islands. Two mobile post offices provide postal services in remote areas in the New Territories.

Post boxes 
Hong Kong imported post-boxes from the UK until the practice was discontinued in the 1980s. Before 1997, the post boxes were painted red, as in the United Kingdom, and were engraved with the royal cypher – for example, "EIIR" to represent Queen Elizabeth II. According to fans of Hong Kong's history, featuring the regal insignia on many of the George V and George VI post boxes in Hong Kong are unique as they are different in design from other British post boxes in the world. Since the transfer of sovereignty to China in 1997, the livery of the boxes became green, and were adorned with the new Hongkong Post logo.

As of October 2015, there are 1,148 free-standing post-boxes in Hong Kong; only 59 colonial post boxes bearing the royal insignia were still in service. In late 2014 Hongkong Post reaffirmed its policy that the remaining 59 colonial-era post boxes would only be replaced if they were seriously damaged or no longer meet the demand of its customers.

Controversy 
This department of government said in March 2015 that it was considering covering up the regal insignia on these post boxes, on grounds that it was "not desirable to have postboxes that show various royal cyphers from different British reigns" and to "avoid confusion". Controversy ignited in September upon confirmation that royal cyphers would be covered up by fixing metal plates on all but seven of the historical post boxes. The decision was decried by the Conservancy Association, the Mailboxes Searching Team, and activists opposed to the push of pro-Beijing politicians to "de-colonialise" Hong Kong. According to legislator Claudia Mo of the Civic Party, senior HK Post officials she talked with affirmed that the order to obscure regal insignia on the 59 colonial post boxes came from the Commerce and Economic Development Bureau (CEDB), which Mo said pointed to a political and not administrative decision.

Services

Post
In addition to making its income from traditional postal delivery, Hongkong Post also sells philatelic products, and is used by the Government and utility companies to accept payment from customers.

Philately
Hongkong Post Stamps was a division set up in 1974, charged with promoting and popularising stamp collecting, to meet the ever-increasing demand for Hong Kong stamps by collectors. The division conducts three main areas of work:

stamp product design and production
fulfilment and advance ordering service 
philatelic marketing.

Owing to the territory's conservative stamp-issuing policy, stamp collecting in Hong Kong is a popular hobby. Different types of attractively designed stamp products are also popular with stamp collectors around the world.

Other

Hongkong Post also provides services listed below:

 Local Courier Post
 Speedpost
 Periodicals/Circular/Direct Mail services
 e-Post
 e-Cert (Electronic Certificate for e-commerce)
 e-Business
 Franking machine
 Postal remittance service (to Canada, Mainland China, Indonesia, Japan, Nepal and the Philippines)
 Electronic remittance service (through Western Union)
 PayThruPost (Bill payment)
 Logistics, etc.

Incidents

In 2005, newspapers revealed the presence of pinhole cameras in Cheung Sha Wan Post Office, and this was perceived as a violation of people's privacy. Hongkong Post explained that the cameras were necessary for facilitating police investigations into several suspected theft cases.
In March 2007, two postal staff lost three bags of mail, destined for Wan Chai and the Eastern District, in the management offices of Hongkong Post buildings. Although Hongkong Post eventually found one of the lost bags, 400 letters were reportedly lost.

Achievements
 Winner of the 2005 "Hong Kong Awards for Industries – Productivity and Quality Award" for achievement in productivity enhancement and total quality management.
 Winner of the Caring Organisation Logo 2005/06 by the Hong Kong Council of Social Service.
 Winner of the Gold Level Certification in the Universal Postal Union EMS Cooperative Audit and Measurement Programme 2005.
 Winner of the Web Care Award 2005 – Gold Prize from Internet Professional Association.
 Guinness World Record holder for the largest stamp mosaic.

List of Postmasters-General

Gallery

See also 

 Chunghwa Post
 China Post
 Correios de Macau
 List of postal services abroad
 List of Hong Kong companies
 Royal Mail – operated in Hong Kong from 1841 to 1870

References

Citations

Sources 

 Stanley Gibbons Ltd.: various catalogues
 
 
 Stuart Rossiter & John Flower: The Stamp Atlas
 Webb, F. W. (1961) The Philatelic and Postal History of Hong Kong and the Treaty Ports of China and Japan, The Royal Philatelic Society London

External links 

 
 
 Chapter 98 POST OFFICE ORDINANCE in the Law of Hong Kong
 香港舊郵筒地圖 Hong Kong Old Postboxes Map

Postal organizations
Post
 
Internet in Hong Kong
Companies established in 1841
Hong Kong brands
1841 establishments in the British Empire